Kiai Sadrach (was born in 1835 in Jepara – died in Purworejo, 14 November 1924) was an evangelist in Central Java, in Indonesia.

Early Introduction to Christianity 
His birth name is Radin. When he studied in a Moslem cleric school in Jombang, he changed his name to Radin Abas. He then moved to Semarang and met an evangelist named Hoezoo. Later on Radin Abas studied Christianity (catechetical) with Hoezoo. Within the class session, he was being introduced to a senior namely Kiai Ibrahim Tunggul Wulung who is already being a Christian and is also coming from the same region, Bondo, Jepara. Radin eventually determined to be the follower of Tunggul Wulung.

Baptized 
Tunggul Wulung and Radin went to Batavia where Radin was finally baptized on 14 April 1867 and was part of Zion Church of Batavia of Hervormd denomination. He was 26 when he was baptized. He got his Christian name Sadrach. Ever since being baptized, he has a duty of delivering Christian brochures and books among the residences of Batavia.
Afterwards, He then went to Semarang where he met Kiai TUnggul Wulung who has already established Christians villages such as Banyuwoto, Tegalombo and Bondo in Jepara. 
Sadrach became the leader of the Bondo congregation as Tunggul Wulung traveled to gain more followers. When Tunggul Wulung went back to Bondo, Sadrach, in the age of 35, set out to Kediri and later on to Purworejo.

In Purworejo Sadrach met and adopted by a priest, Stevens-Philips, in 1869. A year later he moved on to Karangjasa, 25 km to the South of Purworejo.
His decision to leave Steven-Philips is a signature of any kiai behavior at that time, where they are confident and they want to be more independent and confident. 
Kiai Ibrahim is the first person to be christened followed by Kiai Kasanmetaram who is quite famous in that period. The method that is being used by Sadrach is by debate which last for a few days.

Since then, the kiais didn't continue catechetical with Steven-Philips, and had it with Sadrach instead. However, the relationship between Sadrach and Stevens-Philips continued as Steven-Philips is considered to be his formal caretaker with the Colonial ruler. Also, all Sadrach's students were being baptized by Steven-Philips.

Later life 
Sadrach became an influential leader, not only for his ability in public debate but also for his ability to overcome dark magic. The Dutch ruler once captured him in fear of his potential political power within the local natives. He was only detained for 3 months for lacking of evidence. 
He continued his work without any challenges. He later use javanese symbols as method of his teaching such as broom which was distributed to his 80 followers. which means that they have to stick together and being united by Jesus.
On 14 November 1924, Radin Abas Sadrach Supranata died.

References 
 

1835 births
1924 deaths
Evangelists
Indonesian former Muslims
Indonesian Christians
Javanese people